Dmitry Novikov is a deputy for the Communist Party in the 7th State Duma of the Russian Federation. He is first deputy chairman of the State Duma Committee on International Affairs. He was elected effective September 18, 2016. He was educated at the Blagoveshchensk State Pedagogical Institute. His received his degree as a Candidate of Historical Sciences

Novikov was sanctioned by the United States Department of the Treasury following the 2022 Russian invasion of Ukraine.

References 

Year of birth missing (living people)
Living people
21st-century Russian politicians
Communist Party of the Russian Federation members
Russian communists
Fifth convocation members of the State Duma (Russian Federation)
Sixth convocation members of the State Duma (Russian Federation)
Seventh convocation members of the State Duma (Russian Federation)
Eighth convocation members of the State Duma (Russian Federation)
Russian individuals subject to the U.S. Department of the Treasury sanctions